Lee Eun-hyung (born 9 March 1983) is a South Korean actor.

Filmography

Television series

References

External links
 

1983 births
Living people
South Korean male actors
South Korean male television actors